Guillaume-Eugène Chinic (October 26, 1818 – April 28, 1889) was a Canadian businessman and politician.

Born in Quebec City, he was one of the founders of the District Bank of Quebec (now the National Bank of Canada).

In 1873, he was summoned to the Senate of Canada representing the senatorial division of Gulf, Quebec. He sat as a Conservative and resigned in 1882.

He is buried in Cimetière Notre-Dame-de-Belmont.

External links
 
 Biography at the Dictionary of Canadian Biography Online
 

1818 births
1889 deaths
Pre-Confederation Canadian businesspeople
Businesspeople from Quebec
Canadian senators from Quebec
Conservative Party of Canada (1867–1942) senators
Politicians from Quebec City